The Holocene Climate Optimum (HCO) was a warm period that occurred in the interval roughly 9,500 to 5,500 years ago BP, with a thermal maximum around 8000 years BP. It has also been known by many other names, such as Altithermal, Climatic Optimum, Holocene Megathermal, Holocene Optimum, Holocene Thermal Maximum, Hypsithermal, and Mid-Holocene Warm Period.

The warm period was followed by a gradual decline, of about 0.1 to 0.3 °C per millennium, until about two centuries ago (when this trend was rapidly reversed due to human-produced greenhouse gas emissions). However, on a sub-millennial scale, there were regional warm periods superimposed on this decline.
 For other temperature fluctuations, see temperature record.
 For other past climate fluctuation, see paleoclimatology.
 For the pollen zone and Blytt–Sernander period, associated with the climate optimum, see Atlantic (period).

Global effects 

The Holocene Climate Optimum warm event consisted of increases of up to 4 °C near the North Pole (in one study, winter warming of 3 to 9 °C and summer of 2 to 6 °C in northern central Siberia). Northwestern Europe experienced warming, but there was cooling in Southern Europe. The average temperature change appears to have declined rapidly with latitude and so essentially no change in mean temperature is reported at low and middle latitudes. Tropical reefs tend to show temperature increases of less than 1 °C. The tropical ocean surface at the Great Barrier Reef about 5350 years ago was 1 °C warmer and enriched in 18O by 0.5 per mil relative to modern seawater. 

Comparison to current temperatures: In terms of the global average, the 2021 IPCC report expressed medium confidence that temperatures in the last decade are higher than they were in the Mid-Holocene Warm Period. Temperatures in the Northern Hemisphere are simulated to be warmer than present average during the summers, but the tropics and parts of the Southern Hemisphere were colder than average.

Of 140 sites across the western Arctic, there is clear evidence for conditions that were warmer than now at 120 sites. At 16 sites for which quantitative estimates have been obtained, local temperatures were on average 1.6±0.8 °C higher during the optimum than now. Northwestern North America reached peak warmth first, from 11,000 to 9,000 years ago, but the Laurentide Ice Sheet still chilled eastern Canada. Northeastern North America experienced peak warming 4,000 years later. Along the Arctic Coastal Plain in Alaska, there are indications of summer temperatures 2–3 °C warmer than now. Research indicates that the Arctic had less sea ice than now.

In the southwestern Iberian Peninsula, forest cover reached its peak between 9,760 and 7,360 years BP as a result of high moisture availability and warm temperatures during the HCO.

Current desert regions of Central Asia were extensively forested because of higher rainfall, and the warm temperate forest belts in China and Japan were extended northwards.

West African sediments additionally record the African humid period, an interval between 16,000 and 6,000 years ago during which Africa was much wetter than now. That was caused by a strengthening of the African monsoon by changes in summer radiation, which resulted from long-term variations in the Earth's orbit around the Sun. The "Green Sahara" was dotted with numerous lakes, containing typical African lake crocodile and hippopotamus fauna. A curious discovery from the marine sediments is that the transitions into and out of the wet period occurred within decades, not the previously-thought extended periods. It is hypothesized that humans played a role in altering the vegetation structure of North Africa at some point after 8,000 years ago by introducing domesticated animals, which contributed to the rapid transition to the arid conditions that are now found in many locations in the Sahara.

Sea levels in the Sea of Japan were 2-6 metres higher than in the present, with sea surface temperatures being 1-2 °C higher. The East Korea Warm Current reached as far as Primorye and pushed cold water off of the cooler Primorsky Current to the northeast. The Tsushima Current warmed the northern shores of Hokkaido penetrated into the Sea of Okhotsk.

Northwestern Patagonia, in a region known as the Arid Diagonal, was significantly drier during the Early and Middle Holocene, with the region becoming more humid during the Late Holocene following the end of the climatic optimum.

In the far Southern Hemisphere (New Zealand and Antarctica), the warmest period during the Holocene appears to have been roughly 10,500 to 8,000 years ago, immediately after the end of the last ice age. The Amery Ice Shlf retreated approximately 80 kilometres landward during this warm interval. By 6,000 years ago, which is normally associated with the Holocene Climatic Optimum in the Northern Hemisphere, those regions had reached temperatures similar to today, and they did not participate in the temperature changes of the north. However, some authors have used the term "Holocene Climatic Optimum" to describe the earlier southern warm period as well.

Comparison of ice cores
A comparison of the delta profiles at Byrd Station, West Antarctica (2164 m ice core recovered, 1968), and Camp Century, Northwest Greenland, shows the post-glacial climatic optimum. Points of correlation indicate that in both locations, the Holocene climatic optimum (post-glacial climatic optimum) probably occurred at the same time. A similar comparison is evident between the Dye 3 1979 and the Camp Century 1963 cores regarding this period.

The Hans Tausen Ice Cap, in Peary Land (northern Greenland), was drilled in 1977, with a new deep drill to 325 m. The ice core contained distinct melt layers all the way to the bedrock. That indicates that Hans Tausen Iskappe contains no ice from the last glaciation and so the world's northernmost ice cap melted away during the post-glacial climatic optimum and was rebuilt when the climate cooled some 4000 years ago.

From the delta-profile, the Renland ice cap in the Scoresby Sound has always been separated from the inland ice, but all of the delta-leaps revealed in the Camp Century 1963 core recurred in the Renland 1985 ice core. The Renland ice core from East Greenland apparently covers a full glacial cycle from the Holocene into the previous Eemian interglacial. The Renland ice core is 325 m long.

Although the depths are different, the GRIP and NGRIP cores also contain the climatic optimum at very similar times.

Milankovitch cycles 

The climatic event was probably a result of predictable changes in the Earth's orbit (Milankovitch cycles) and a continuation of changes that caused the end of the last glacial period.

The effect would have had the maximum heating of the Northern Hemisphere 9,000 years ago, when the axial tilt was 24° and the nearest approach to the Sun (perihelion) was during the Northern Hemisphere's summer. The calculated Milankovitch Forcing would have provided 0.2% more solar radiation (+40 W/m2) to the Northern Hemisphere in summer, which tended to cause more heating. There seems to have been the predicted southward shift in the global band of thunderstorms, the Intertropical Convergence Zone.

However, orbital forcing would predict maximum climate response several thousand years earlier than those observed in the Northern Hemisphere. The delay may be a result of the continuing changes in climate, as the Earth emerged from the last glacial period and related to ice–albedo feedback. Different sites often show climate changes at somewhat different times and lasting for different durations. At some locations, climate changes may have begun as early as 11,000 years ago or have persisted until 4,000 years ago. As noted above, the warmest interval in the far south significantly preceded warming in the north.

Other changes 
Significant temperature changes do not appear to have occurred at most low-latitude sites, but other climate changes have been reported, such as significantly wetter conditions in Africa, Australia and Japan
and desert-like conditions in the Midwestern United States. Areas around the Amazon show temperature increases and drier conditions.

See also

References 

History of climate variability and change
Holocene

de:Atlantikum